The Promise of Forever is a 2017 Philippine drama television series starring Paulo Avelino, Ritz Azul and Ejay Falcon. The series aired on ABS-CBN's Kapamilya Gold afternoon block and worldwide on The Filipino Channel from September 11, 2017 to November 24, 2017, replacing The Better Half.

Cast and characters

Main cast
 Paulo Avelino as Lorenzo Espinosa / Ramon Nolasco / Victor Gonzales / Emilio "Emil" Mendoza / Nicolas Barrientos / Lawrence Molina
 Ritz Azul as Sophia Madrid
 Ejay Falcon as Philip Ortega

Supporting cast
 Cherry Pie Picache as Vivienne Zialcita-Madrid
 Amy Austria-Ventura as Olivia Ortega-Borja 
 Tonton Gutierrez as Marlon Borja
 Benjie Paras as Geoffrey Madrid
 Susan Africa as Janet Trinidad/Helen Reyes
 Eva Darren as Lola Faye Zialcita
 Nico Antonio as Chester Trinidad / Benjamin "Bing" Reyes / Matthew Santos
 David Chua as Michael Borja
 Khaine dela Cruz as Adrien Espinosa
 Princess Punzalan as Marcela dela Paz

Guest cast
 Mutya Orquia as young Sophia Madrid
 Lance Lucido as young Philip Ortega
 Sarah Lahbati as Elizabeth Dela Paz
 Desiree del Valle as Grace Madrid
 Ahron Villena as Fredrick Borja
 Levi Ignacio as William Borja

Special finale participation
 Anjo Damiles as adult Adrien Espinosa

Production
Filming for The Promise of Forever began in May 2016, with majority of the scenes were shot in Eastern and Western European countries; it was also the first Philippine drama to be filmed in Czech Republic. The series was fully pre-produced, filmed more than a year before airing, with a total of less than 13 weeks of airing were confirmed.

Timeslot
In the first media announcement of upcoming telenovela Victims of Love (now known as Asintado) on March 15, 2017, Paulo Avelino mentioned that The Promise of Forever will premiere in summer season. It was originally supposed to replace the Korean drama Love in the Moonlight on a late evening timeslot, but was postponed by the management due to requests and appeals by the Koreanovela fans.

After the long delay, The Promise of Forever finally premiered on September 11, 2017 but became part of the Kapamilya Gold afternoon block, replacing The Better Half. The drama switched places with The Good Son which is now moved to Primetime Bida block.

Reception

See also
List of programs broadcast by ABS-CBN
List of drama series of ABS-CBN

References

External links
 

ABS-CBN drama series
Philippine science fiction television series
Fantaserye and telefantasya
Philippine romance television series
2017 Philippine television series debuts
2017 Philippine television series endings
Television series by Dreamscape Entertainment Television
Television shows filmed in Belgium
Television shows filmed in the Czech Republic
Television shows filmed in the Netherlands
Television shows filmed in the Philippines
Television shows filmed in Poland
Filipino-language television shows